Hemiphragmoceratidae is a family of endogastrically brevconic oncocerids characterized by elaborately visored apertures in which the hyponomic sinus in mature specimens is on a spout-like process and there may be  lateral and dorsal salients. (Sweet 1964, Flower 1950). Shells are compressed with the apical portion curved and the anterior straight. Siphucles are nummuloideal with expanded spheroidal segments and  continuously actinosiphonate interiors.

The Hemiphragmoceratidae are probably descended from the Oncoceratidae and are known from the middle and upper Silurian but may range into the middle Devonian (Sweet 1964). They are similar with regards to their constricted and ornate apertures to the middle Silurian exogastric Trimeroceratidae and the  Siluro-devonian discosorid Phragmoceratidae (Teichert 1964) 

Some five genera have been described; Hemiphragmoceras, Conradoceras, Hexameroceras, Octamerella, and Tetrameroceras.

References

 Sweet, W. C. 1964; Nautiloidea-Oncocerida, in the Treatise on Invertebrate Paleontology; Geological Society of America and University of Kansas Press. 
 Flower, R. H. and Kummel B, 1950; A Classification of the Nautiloidea; Journal of Paleontology  V24 n.5 Sept 1950
 Teichert, C. 1964; Nautiloidea-Discosorida,  in the Treatise on Invertebrate Paleontology; Geological Society of America and University of Kansas Press.

Prehistoric nautiloid families
Silurian first appearances
Silurian cephalopods
Devonian cephalopods
Middle Devonian extinctions
Oncocerida